What You Need may refer to:

Television
 "What You Need" (Centaurworld), a 2021 episode of the animated series
 "What You Need" (The Twilight Zone), a 1959 episode of the series

Music

Albums
 What You Need (Stacy Lattisaw album), 1989
 What You Need (Side Effect album), 1976

Songs
 "What You Need" (INXS song), 1985
 "What You Need" (Powerhouse song)", 1999
 "What You Need", a song by Britney Spears from her 2016 album Glory
 "What You Need", a 2011 song by The Weeknd from the mixtape House of Balloons
 "What You Need", a 2015 song by Bring Me the Horizon from the album That's the Spirit
 "What You Need", a 1992 song by Audio Adrenaline from Audio Adrenaline

See also